Miss Teen USA 2016 was the 34th Miss Teen USA pageant, was held at The Venetian Theatre in Las Vegas, Nevada on July 30, 2016. Katherine Haik of Louisiana crowned her successor Karlie Hay of Texas, at the end of the event. The pageant was webcast on the Miss Universe website, Facebook page, and mobile app as well as on Xbox 360 and Xbox One consoles via Xbox Live. It was hosted by Miss USA 2015 Olivia Jordan and social media star Cody Johns, while American Idol winner Nick Fradiani performed.
This is the first time that the state of Nevada hosted the pageant and the first Miss Teen USA pageant held in the United States since 2007.

Since this year, the swimsuit competition has been replaced by the sportswear competition.

Results

Special Awards

Historical significance 
 Texas wins competition for the third time.
 North Carolina earns the 1st runner-up position for the third time. This was last placed in 2006. 
 South Carolina earns the 2nd runner-up position for the first time and it reaches the highest position since K. Lee Graham won Miss Teen USA 2014.
 Alabama earns the 3rd runner-up position for the first time, becoming the highest placement of this state and surpasses its previous placement in 1988.
 Nevada earns the 4th runner-up position for the first time.
 States that placed in semifinals the previous year were Alabama, California,  Louisiana, Missouri, North Carolina, South Carolina, Tennessee, Texas and Vermont.
 South Carolina placed for the sixth consecutive year. This is the longest streak of placements that a state has hold ever.
 California and Tennessee placed for the fourth consecutive year.
 Texas placed for the third consecutive year.
 Alabama, Louisiana, Missouri, North Carolina and Vermont placed for the second consecutive year.
 Delaware last placed in 2014.
 Georgia last placed in 2013.
 Illinois and Ohio last placed in 2012.
 Nevada last placed in 2009.
 South Dakota last placed in 1989.
 Arizona, Massachusetts, Oklahoma and Pennsylvania break an ongoing streak of placements since 2014.

Order of announcement

Top 15

Top 5

Pageant

Selection of contestants
One delegate from each state and the District of Columbia were chosen in state pageants held from September 2015 to January 2016.

Competition rounds
For the first time, the swimsuit competition did not take place and was replaced with an athletic wear competition. Tapout, in collaboration with clothing designer Goldsheep, designed the athletic wear outfits for the pageant, with each individual outfit based on the delegates' representative states.

Preliminary round
Prior to the final competition, the delegates competed in the preliminary competition, which involves private interviews with the judges and a presentation show where they compete in athletic wear and evening gown. It was held on July 29, 2016 and was broadcast on the Miss Universe website and mobile app.

Finals
During the final competition, the top fifteen competed in athletic wear and evening gown. The top five also competed in a customized final question round, and the winner was decided by a panel of judges.

Judges
The judges for the pageant were:
Natalie Eva Marie – WWE wrestler
Hilary Cruz – Miss Teen USA 2007 from Colorado
Keylee Sue Sanders – Miss Teen USA 1995 from Kansas
Lu Parker – Miss USA 1994 from South Carolina
Savannah Keyes – Singer

Contestants
51 delegates have been confirmed:

Notes and references

Notes

References

External links
 Miss Teen USA official website

2016 beauty pageants
2016
July 2016 events in the United States
2016 in Nevada